Philosophy is the scholarly journal of the Royal Institute of Philosophy. It is designed to be intelligible to the non-specialist reader and has been in continuous publication since 1926. It is published by Cambridge University Press and is currently edited by Maria Alvarez and Bill Brewer.

The journal was established in 1926 "to build bridges between specialist philosophers and a wider educated public." Each issue contains a "New Books" section and an editorial on a topic of philosophical or public interest.

References

External links
 
 Royal Institute of Philosophy

Philosophy journals
Cambridge University Press academic journals
English-language journals
Publications established in 1926
Quarterly journals
1926 establishments in England